Fawwar is a Palestinian town and refugee camp in the Hebron Governorate, located six kilometers southwest of Hebron in the southern West Bank. According to the Palestinian Central Bureau of Statistics, the camp had a population of 6,544 in 2007.

Fawwar Camp was established in 1949 to accommodate Palestinian refugees from Beersheba and Bayt Jibrin and the surrounding area on 350 dunams of land. There are two schools in the town: a boys' school and girls' school with roughly 1,050 students each.

Since the Six-Day War in 1967, Fawwar has been under Israeli occupation. The population in the 1967 census conducted by the Israeli authorities was 2,233.

Incidents
On 12 May  2021 Hussein Titi (28), after an Israeli raid on the village led to the arrest of his neighbor, was shot dead when he went up to the roof of his house and peeked out to see what was happening.
On 13 May 13, 2020 Zeid Qaysiyah (17)  was shot dead, with a bullet to his face, by a sniper posted over a 100 metres away,  while  Qaysiyah was watching, together with his nieces, an Israeli raid on the village conducted by the elite Israeli Duvdevan unit, which sought to arrest a mentally disabled local youth for comments he had made on Facebook.

References

External links
 Welcome to al-Fawwar R.C.
Al Fawwar Camp (fact sheet), Applied Research Institute–Jerusalem (ARIJ)
Al Fawwar Refugee Camp profile, ARIJ
Al Fawwar Refugee Camp  aerial photo, ARIJ
Needs for development in Al Fawwar Refugee Camp based on the community and local authorities' assessment, ARIJ
Fawwar, articles from UNWRA

Palestinian refugee camps in the West Bank
Populated places established in 1949